Code of Scotland Yard is a 1947 British crime film directed by George King and starring Oskar Homolka, Muriel Pavlow and Derek Farr. It was originally released as The Shop at Sly Corner, being based on the popular stage play of that title by Edward Percy.

Synopsis
A French antique dealer (Homolka) lives a comfortable life in London. He cares only for his daughter (Pavlow), who is trying to become a professional concert violinist. When his shop assistant (Griffith) discovers that much of his money comes from fencing stolen goods he attempts to blackmail the Frenchman.

Cast
 Oskar Homolka as Descius Heiss
 Derek Farr as Robert Graham
 Muriel Pavlow as Margaret Heiss
 Manning Whiley as Corder Morris
 Kathleen Harrison as Mrs Catt
 Garry Marsh as Major Elliot
 Kenneth Griffith as Archie Fellowes
 Jan Van Loewen as Professor Vanetti
 Irene Handl as Ruby Towser
 Johnnie Schofield as Inspector Robson
 Diana Dors as Mildred
 Katie Johnson as Woman in Shop
 Vi Kaley as Flower Seller
 David Keir as Gentleman Customer
 James Knight as Publican
 Eliot Makeham as Theatre Usher

Original play
The film was based on a play by Edward Percy, a Conservative MP. It debuted in London in May 1945. Variety called it "good theatre".

It ran for over two years. The London production only cost $12,000 and made a sizeable profit for its investors.

The play was produced on Broadway with Boris Karloff in 1949 but only ran seven performances.

BBC TV version
The play was adapted for BBC TV in 1946.

Production
Film rights were bought by British Lion in May 1945. It would be one of the first three movies made by Alex Korda under his new deal with British Lion, the others being A Man about the House and Nightbeat.

Oscar Homolka was imported from the US to star.

George King was to make A Lady was to Die but delayed that to make this movie. Filming started at 6 August 1946. It was shot at Isleworth Studios. The film's sets were designed by the art director Bernard Robinson.

It was the film debut of Diana Dors. According to film reviewer Stephen Vagg, "The part was an ideal way to start out – the girlfriend of a slimy blackmailer – and Diana had 'it' from the start: looks, warmth, appeal."

Muriel Pavlow and Derek Farr, who played lovers in the movie, were married shortly after filming.

Critical reception
Variety reported that the "film gathers pace and is truly cinematic in the second half, but the first part is deadly slow and too explanatory without explaining much. More, too, should have been made of the romance between the two young lovers." TV Guide described it as an "interesting melodrama rich with character, thanks to the excellent performance by Homolka and a uniformly fine British cast."

References

External links
 
The Shop at Sly Corner at Letterbox DVD
The Shop at Sly Corner at BFI
Complete film at Internet Archive

1947 films
1947 crime films
British crime films
Films directed by George King
Films set in London
Films shot at Isleworth Studios
British black-and-white films
Fiction about retailing
1940s English-language films
1940s British films